The 1927 Wightman Cup was the fifth edition of the annual women's team tennis competition between the United States and Great Britain. It was held at the West Side Tennis Club in Forest Hills, Queens in New York City, NY in the United States.

See also
 1927 Davis Cup

References

1927
1927 in tennis
1927 in American tennis
1927 in British sport
1927 in women's tennis